The Hocking Hills is a deeply dissected area of the Allegheny Plateau in Appalachian Ohio, primarily in Hocking County, that features cliffs, gorges, rock shelters, and waterfalls.  The relatively extreme topography in this area is due to the Blackhand Sandstone (so named because of Native American graphics on the formation near Newark, Ohio), a particular formation that is thick, hard and weather-resistant, and so forms high cliffs and narrow, deep gorges.

Component open-space areas
Most of the more scenic areas of the region are under state ownership, including:
Hocking Hills State Park (with five use areas: Ash Cave, Cedar Falls, Old Man's Cave, Rockhouse, and Cantwell Cliffs) 
Hocking State Forest
Conkle's Hollow State Nature Preserve
Sheick Hollow State Nature Preserve (entry by permit only)
Little Rocky Hollow State Nature Preserve (entry by permit only)
Kessler Swamp State Nature Preserve
Lake Logan State Park
Wayne National Forest
Rockbridge State Nature Preserve

The core area also includes two privately owned preserves, Crane Hollow and Camp Oty-Okwa (owned by Big Brothers and Big Sisters of Central Ohio).

The geological series that forms the Hocking Hills extends south and west, gradually diminishing but still forming impressive bluffs and gorges in:
Clear Creek Metro Park, part of the Columbus and Franklin County Metropolitan Park District
Rising Park in Lancaster
Wahkeena Memorial State Nature Preserve in Fairfield County
Christmas Rocks State Nature Preserve in Fairfield County 
Rhododendron Cove State Nature Preserve in Fairfield County 
Shallenberger State Nature Preserve in Fairfield County 
Saltpetre Cave State Nature Preserve in Hocking County
Boch Hollow State Nature Preserve (exposure is along the westernmost edge only) in Hocking County
Lake Katharine State Nature Preserve in Jackson County
Blackhand Gorge State Nature Preserve in Licking County
Liberty Wildlife Area in Jackson County

The Buckeye Trail, along with the North Country Trail and the American Discovery Trail, passes through the Hocking Hills region.

Also nearby are:
Lake Hope State Park
Zaleski State Forest
Camp Wyandot
Tar Hollow State Park
Tar Hollow State Forest
Camp Akita (UCC church camp)

Climate
The region has mild weather with an average rainfall of 40.3 inches per year and an average of about 175 sunny days per year. The average July high is 84.8 degrees Fahrenheit and the average January low is 19.3 degrees Fahrenheit.

History

The region was first settled by Christian Eby and was named from a shortened version of the Hockhocking River by the Shawnee Indian tribe.  "Hockhocking", in the Delaware tongue, signifies a bottle. The Shawnee people thought that a very narrow and straight creek above the waterfall on the Hockhocking River resembled a bottle's neck.

Other notable settlers were George Starkey and Moses Dolson. The first election on county matters was held in Eby's mill near Queer Creek. The first post office in the area was called the "Rockhouse" and was located in Herschel Badford's home.

Hocking County formation
Hocking County was formed on March 1, 1818, from Ross, Athens, Fairfield and Logan. The county's boundaries and townships have not been altered since 1851. Due to its natural surroundings, it has become a tourist attraction.

Outdoor activities
Visitors can experience Hocking Hills through outdoor activities year round, including farmers' markets, wine tastings and train rides. Activities include: 
 Athens Farmers Market 
 Earth, Water, Rock: Outdoor Adventures
 Hocking Hills Canopy Tours (late March through the last weekend in November) 
 Happy Hills Fun Park 
 Hocking Hills Gem Mine 
 Hocking Hills Marina at Lake Logan
 Hocking Hills Primal Trek
 Hocking Hills Adventures 
 Ultimate Zipline Adventures 
 Hocking Valley Scenic Railway
 Hunting at Hocking Hills Cabins 
 Shade Winery 
 Sharp Farms Pumpkins & Corn Maze 
 The Buckeye Trail 
 Touch the Earth Adventures
 Valley Zipline Tours Walker Farm
 Wayne National Forest
 Nelsonville's Historic Public Square

Hiking trails
Hocking County offers miles of trails that vary in length and difficulty depending on location. Some trails are pet friendly.
 
 Old Man's Cave: 1 mile   
 Ash Cave Gorge: ¼ mile, wheelchair accessible   
 Ash Cave Rim: ½ mile   
 Cedar Falls: ½ mile   
 Rock House: 1 mile   
 Cantwell Cliffs: various trails, around 3 miles  
 Conkle's Hollow: 1 mile, wheelchair accessible
 Conkle's Hollow Rim: 2½ miles   
 Buckeye Trail: Cedar Falls – Ash Cave: 3 miles, Old Man's Cave – Cedar Falls: 3 mile; also over 1,400 other miles around the state of Ohio, coincident with the North Country Trail and the American Discovery Trail in the Hocking Hills area.

Rare plants
The Hocking Hills area harbors a number of rare plants, including Huperzia porophila, the rock firmoss; Botrychium simplex, the least grape fern; Silene rotundifolia, the round-leaf catchfly, and Trichomanes boschianum, the Appalachian filmy fern.

See also
Appalachian Ohio
Ohio public lands

References

External links 

Hocking Hills at American Byways
 Hocking Hills State Park
 Hocking Hills Official Website
 Hocking Hills Tourism Association
 Hocking Hills Tourism Website
Hocking Hills tourist information and maps
Zipline in Hocking Hills

Mountains of Ohio
.Hocking Hills
Hills of the United States
Allegheny Plateau
Landmarks in Ohio